Near North Riverfront is a neighborhood of St. Louis, Missouri. Between 1990 and 2000 Near North Riverfront led the city in percentage population growth, growing 89% over the decade. Despite this large percentage growth, Near North Riverfront is largely non-residential and so the 89% percent gain represented a numerical gain of only 306 persons. The neighborhood is served by major city streets such as Tucker Boulevard, West Florissant Avenue, and Broadway Boulevard.

Demographics
In 2020 Near North Riverfront's racial makeup was 50.6% Black, 42.5% White, 0.3% Native American, 2.8% Asian, 2.1% Two or More Races, and 1.8% Some Other Race. 3.8% of the population was of Hispanic or Latino origin.

References

Neighborhoods in St. Louis